Eskeleth is a hamlet in Arkengarthdale in North Yorkshire, England. It is in the Yorkshire Dales National Park.  Eskeleth sits  from the village of Reeth.

As with all places in Arkengarthdale, there is no record for the location in the Domesday Book, however, in 1280, it was recorded as Exherlede.  The origin of the name is uncertain.  The first element in the name seems difficult to trace, but the second element is likely to be Old English or Old Norse hlið 'slope'.

References 

Villages in North Yorkshire
Arkengarthdale